Lamèque is an unincorporated community in Gloucester County, New Brunswick, Canada. It held town status prior to 2023.

Of Amerindian rather than French origin, "Lamèque" comes from the Micmac Elmugwadasik, a descriptive reference to the fact that "the head of the tidal river is turned to one side".  The name of the island approved by the Canadian Permanent Committee on Geographical Names in 1974, the result of a local petition replaced the earlier Shippegan.

History

A Francophone community, it is situated on Lamèque Island, off the northeastern tip of the Acadian Peninsula.  Lamèque has hosted an annual baroque music festival every summer since 1975.

On 1 January 2023, Lamèque amalgamated with the village of Sainte-Marie-Saint-Raphaël and annexed the local service districts making up the remainder of Lamèque Island to form the new town of Île-de-Lamèque. Lamèque's name remains in official use as a community.

Demographics

Language

Economy 
Lamèque's economy is tied to the fishing and peat industries.

Attractions 
The Lamèque Eco-Parc offers numerous flora and fauna features representative of the Acadian Peninsula.

Notable people

See also
List of communities in New Brunswick

References

External links
  Ville de Lameque

Communities in Gloucester County, New Brunswick
Former towns in New Brunswick
Populated coastal places in Canada